Mazerolles is a commune in the Pyrénées-Atlantiques department in south-western France. The locally-famous pastry pastis d'Amélie is produced here, at the Larquier bakery.

See also
Communes of the Pyrénées-Atlantiques department

References

External links
Le pastis d'Amélie Web site

Communes of Pyrénées-Atlantiques